Chukchi may refer to:
Chukchi people
Chukchi language
Chukchi Peninsula
Chukchi Sea

See also
Chukotka (disambiguation)
Chukotsky (disambiguation)

Language and nationality disambiguation pages